Norway was represented by Anita Skorgan, with the song "Oliver", at the 1979 Eurovision Song Contest, which took place on 31 March in Jerusalem, Israel. "Oliver" was chosen as the Norwegian entry at the Melodi Grand Prix on 10 February. This was the second of three Eurovision appearances (and a further uncredited fourth) for Skorgan.

Before Eurovision

Melodi Grand Prix 1979 
The Melodi Grand Prix 1979 final round was held at the studios of broadcaster NRK in Oslo, hosted by Egil Teige. 
No live audience was present, nor was there a stage with scenery or props --only the orchestra and contestants, who were permitted to wear only simple clothing. The orchestra was conducted by Norwegian composer Egil Monn-Inversen.

A total of 331 entries were received, and of them eight entries were selected. The jury consisted of the musicians Kjell Karlsen, Fred Nøddelund and Øyvind Westby.

Eight songs were presented in the final round, with the winner chosen by an "expert" jury which included Kirsti Sparboe, who represented Norway in 1965, 1967, and 1969, and Norwegian Eurovision conductors Carsten Klouman and Sigurd Jansen. Future Eurovision winner Hanne Krogh also took part.

At Eurovision 
On the night of the final Skorgan performed 16th in the running order, following Sweden and preceding the United Kingdom. At the close of voting "Oliver" had picked up 57 points, placing Norway 11th of the 19 entries. The Norwegian jury awarded its 12 points to contest winners Israel.

Voting

References

External links 
Full national final on nrk.no

1979
Countries in the Eurovision Song Contest 1979
1979
Eurovision
Eurovision